Michael Bennett is a former professional football player. He was signed by the Cincinnati Bengals in 2015, and cut from the team in 2016.

References

1991 births
Living people
Cincinnati Bengals players
American football wide receivers
Georgia Bulldogs football players